The 10th World Cup season began in December 1975 in France and concluded in March 1976 in Canada.  Ingemar Stenmark of Sweden won the first of his three consecutive overall titles.  Defending women's overall champion Annemarie Moser-Pröll, who had won five straight overall titles, missed the entire season so that she could care for her father, who was terminally ill with lung cancer.  In her absence, Rosi Mittermaier of West Germany, a double gold medalist at the 1976 Winter Olympics, won the women's overall title.

This was also the first year that a season champion was recognized in the Combined discipline, which was added the previous year.  After this year, the World Cup would not award a season championship trophy in Combined again until 1980.  Additionally, individual parallel slalom was made a permanent fixture at the season-ending Nations Cup championships; however, it only counted for the team competition.  After 1992, it was replaced by a team parallel slalom event, which again only counted for the Nations Cup team competition.

A break in the schedule in February was for the 1976 Winter Olympics in Innsbruck, Austria.

Calendar

Men

Ladies

Men

Overall 

The Men's Overall World Cup 1975/76 was divided into two periods. From the first 14 races the best 8 results count and from the last 11 races the best 6 results count. In this season only Piero Gros has a point deduction! Only the 4 points for his 7th place in the Giant Slalom in Copper Mountain were deducted.

Downhill 

In Men's Downhill World Cup 1975/76 the best 5 results count. Franz Klammer won 5 races and won the cup with maximum points. He won 4 downhill races in a row. Together with the first 5 downhill races in the next season 1976/77, he won 9 downhill races in a row!!

Giant Slalom 

In Men's Giant Slalom World Cup 1975/76 the best 5 results count. Ingemar Stenmark won the cup with only 1 win. In 7 races there were 6 different winners.

Slalom 

In Men's Slalom World Cup 1975/76 the best 5 results count. Ingemar Stenmark won 5 races and won the cup with maximum points. He won 4 slalom races in a row.

Combined 
In Men's Combined World Cup 1975/76 all results count. This was the first ever Combined World Cup.

Ladies

Overall 

The Women's Overall World Cup 1975/76 was divided into two periods. From the first 14 races the best 8 results count and from the last 12 races the best 6 results count. Four racers had a point deduction.

Downhill 

In Women's Downhill World Cup 1975/76 the best 5 results count.

Giant Slalom 

In Women's Giant Slalom World Cup 1975/76 the best 5 results count.

Slalom 

In Women's Slalom World Cup 1975/76 the best 5 results count.

Combined 

In Women's Combined World Cup 1975/76 all results count. This was the first ever Combined World Cup!

Nations Cup

Overall

Men

Ladies

References

External links
FIS-ski.com - World Cup standings - 1976

FIS Alpine Ski World Cup
World Cup
World Cup